Jaan Pakk may refer to:
 Jaan Pakk (politician) (1877-1948), Estonian politician, a member of Estonian Constituent Assembly
 Jaan Pakk (conductor)  (1901-1979), Estonian conductor